The 1981 Idaho Vandals football team represented the University of Idaho in the 1981 NCAA Division I-AA football season. The Vandals, led by fourth-year head coach Jerry Davitch, were members of the Big Sky Conference and played their home games at the Kibbie Dome, an indoor facility on campus in Moscow, Idaho.

Led by sophomore quarterback Ken Hobart in the veer offense, the Vandals finished 3–8 in the regular season but were  winless in the Big Sky. In the season finale, Idaho lost to rival Boise State for the fifth straight year, but it was the Broncos' last win over Idaho until 1994, as the Vandals won a dozen straight in the interim.  In their third and final win in early October, running back Russell Davis set a school record with 345 rushing yards at Portland State.

In August, Sports Illustrated had picked the Vandals as one of the top teams in Division I-AA, with high expectations to improve on the previous year's  record. But after a fifth straight loss and no wins in six conference games, Davitch was fired nine days before the final game against Boise State. Several weeks later Dennis Erickson was hired and immediately turned the Vandal program around in 1982, reaching the quarterfinals of the 12-team Division I-AA playoffs.

In 1981, Idaho State and Boise State were the top two teams in the Big Sky and both advanced to the 8-team Division I-AA playoffs, won their first-round games, and hosted the semifinals.

Notable players
Sophomore quarterback Ken Hobart of Kamiah changed from an option quarterback in the veer to a prolific passer under Erickson. He led the Vandals to a 9–4 record in 1982 and an 8–3 record in 1983 as a senior, when he was a Division I-AA All-American. Hobart played a season in the USFL with Jacksonville in 1984 and several in the CFL.

Junior linebacker Sam Merriman from Tucson was selected in the seventh round (177th overall) of the 1983 NFL Draft by the Seattle Seahawks. A four-year starter for the Vandals, he played five seasons with Seattle, primarily on special teams. A serious knee injury in a 1988 preseason game ended his playing career.

Fallen teammate
At the close of the 1981 spring semester, Vandal wide receiver Joe Keogh, age 20, was killed in a mid-morning automobile accident. En route to Seattle on Saturday, May 16, he was one of four occupants in a vehicle westbound on Interstate 90, west of Ellensburg. The driver, a family friend, lost control and veered off the road and the car ended on its side. Keogh, a 1979 graduate of Gonzaga Prep in Spokane, was the only fatality.

Keogh's Vandal teammates wore his number 4 on the right side of their helmets during the 1981 season. It was the second death for the football team in less than ten months: prior to his senior season, standout running back Glen White  had died in August 1980 after a brief battle with aplastic anemia.

Schedule

Roster

All-conference
No Vandals made the first team; second team selections included quarterback Ken Hobart, wide receiver Jack Klein, and  linebackers Sam Merriman and 
Honorable mention were tackle Bruce Fery, guard Steve Seman, defensive linemen John Fortner and Dan Saso, and safety Kelly Miller. Despite leading the conference with over 111 yards rushing per game, running back Russell Davis was overlooked.

NFL Draft
Two Vandal seniors were selected in the 1982 NFL Draft, which lasted twelve rounds (334 selections).

List of Idaho Vandals in the NFL Draft

References

External links
Gem of the Mountains: 1982 University of Idaho yearbook – 1981 football season
Idaho Argonaut – student newspaper – 1981 editions

Idaho
Idaho Vandals football seasons
Idaho Vandals football